Bramberg Castle is the ruin of a Würzburg castle in the Haßberge hills in the county of Haßberge in Lower Franconia, Bavaria Germany.

The ruin is located on the Bramberg hill (495 metres).  It is about 2 km north west of the village of Bramberg, part of the municipality of Ebern. Destroyed during the German Peasants' War in 1525, it is accessible by parking just off the road and hiking up the hill.

Literature 
 Die Kunstdenkmäler des Königreichs Bayern, III,5, Bezirksamt Hofheim, pp. 31–34, Munich, 1912
 Joachim Zeune: Burgen im Eberner Land. Ebern, 2003, (Eberner Heimatblätter, Volume 2)

External links 

 Bramberg at Burgen Welt Burgenwelt.de
 Reconstruction by Wolfgang Braun

Castles in Bavaria
Buildings and structures in Haßberge (district)
Landmarks in Germany
Bibra family
Hill castles
Ruined castles in Germany